Church of St Cyril of Turau and All the Patron Saints of the Belarusian People (also known as the Belarusian Memorial Chapel) is a wooden church in Woodside Park, London. It is the first wooden church built in London since the Great Fire. It is also the first purpose-built Catholic church of Byzantine rite in London, the first memorial dedicated to the 1986 Chernobyl Nuclear Disaster erected in Western Europe, the first Belarusian Uniate church built outside Belarus and the first church building made principally out of cross laminated timber panels in London.

The church is located next to the Francis Skaryna Belarusian Library and Museum and the Marian House, a Belarusian community centre in Northern London.

Construction

The Belarusian Catholic mission existed in London since 1947, led by exiled priests Ceslaus Sipovich, Leo Haroshka and later Alexander Nadson. The mission is historically closely related to the Francis Skaryna Belarusian Library and Museum, for which it became the initial base. During the first decades of its existence, the mission only had an in-house chapel for worship, not a separate church.

The construction of the church began in November 2015; the foundation was completed in January 2016 and the cornerstone brought from the Holy Trinity Church in Druja was laid during a ceremony presided by the Apostolic Papal Nuncio, Archbishop Antonio Mennini and the Bishop of the Ukrainian Catholic Eparchy of Holy Family of London, Bishop Hlib Lonchyna, on 7 February 2016. It was consecrated on December 17, 2016.

Architecture

The design of the church was primarily inspired by the rural wooden churches in Belarus. The materials palette was restricted to wood and glass. The church has been clad in timber with restricted areas of clerestory windows and obscured glazing. It is therefore essentially ‘windowless’ reflecting the inward-focused Byzantine liturgical tradition. The design of the external walls was inspired by the traditional vertical timber cladding of the Baroque Uniate churches of Belarus.

Awards

The Belarusian Memorial Chapel was featured at the 2017 London Festival of Architecture and received the RIBA London Regional Award 2017 of the Royal Institute of British Architects. It has also been named People's Choice at the New London Awards 2017 by New London Architecture.

The chapel was chosen by the Royal Academy of Arts as one of the 10 buildings to see at Open House London 2017. Architizer has named it one of the 10 Catholic Churches Designed to Uplift and Inspire. On 21 October 2018, ArchDaily included the Belarusian chapel to the list of 32 best chapels previously published on the site.

The chapel was also nominated for the EU Prize in Contemporary Architecture - Mies Van der Rohe Award 2019, the highest accolade in European Architecture.

Interiors

The iconostasis and the altar area of the church contain icons painted in 1926 by the Russian Catholic convert Duchess Olga Bennigsen and Mr Eric Ward (presumably a son of either William George Ward, theologian and mathematician, or of his son Wilfrid Philip Ward) for an Eastern Liturgical Week at the Westminster Cathedral as well as several icons from the former iconostasis of the Belarusian Catholic church of Christ the Redeemer in Chicago, now closed.

Burials

On May 13, 2017 the ashes of Vera Rich, an English poet and translator from Belarusian language, were buried in the church.

Gallery

See also
Belarusians in the United Kingdom
Belarusian Greek Catholic Church

References

External links
Belarusian Church in London
The Belarusian Memorial Chapel at spheronarchitects.co.uk
Religion Completed Buildings Winner: Spheron Architects — Tszwai So's presentation of the church at the World Architecture Festival 2018 (video)
Дазвол будаваць беларускую царкву ў Лёндане атрыманы
Каб стварыць беларускую царкву ў Лондане, кітаец вывучыў нашу гісторыю

Belarusian diaspora in Europe
Churches in the London Borough of Barnet
Belarusian Greek Catholic churches in the United Kingdom
Eastern Catholic church buildings in London
Wooden churches in England
Churches completed in 2016
2016 establishments in England
Architecture in Belarus